The 2013–14 Air21 Express season was the 3rd and final season of the franchise in the Philippine Basketball Association (PBA).

Key dates
November 3: The 2013 PBA Draft took place in Midtown Atrium, Robinson Place Manila.
March 12: The Express got star point-guard Jonas Villanueva in a trade.
April 4: Express's Jonas Villanueva's four champion streak as the All-Star weekend Obstacle Course Champion was ended and defeated by Mark Barroca.
April 25: The Express got their first franchise Semifinal appearance as they defeated the San Miguel Beermen twice on a twice to beat matchup on the quarterfinals. 
June 26: The Express sold their franchise to the Metro Pacific Investments Corporation, Inc.

Draft picks

Roster

Philippine Cup

Eliminations

Standings

Commissioner's Cup

Eliminations

Standings

Playoffs

Bracket

Governors' Cup

Eliminations

Standings

Bracket

Game log

Transactions

Trades

Pre-season

Recruited imports

References

Air21
Air21 Express seasons